Michelle Taggart (born 6 May 1970) is an American snowboarder, born in Salem, Oregon. She competed in women's halfpipe at the 1998 Winter Olympics in Nagano.

References

External links

1970 births
Living people
American female snowboarders
Olympic snowboarders of the United States
Snowboarders at the 1998 Winter Olympics
21st-century American women